Statherotis is a genus of moths belonging to the subfamily Olethreutinae of the family Tortricidae.

Species
Statherotis abathodes Diakonoff, 1973
Statherotis afonini Razowski, 2009
Statherotis agitata (Meyrick, 1909)
Statherotis amaeboea (Lower, 1896)
Statherotis ancosema (Meyrick, 1932)
Statherotis antisema Diakonoff, 1973
Statherotis aspidias (Meyrick, 1909)
Statherotis ateuches Razowski, 2013
Statherotis atrifracta Diakonoff, 1973
Statherotis batrachodes (Meyrick, 1911)
Statherotis catharosema Diakonoff, 1973
Statherotis catherota Meyrick, 1928
Statherotis decorata Meyrick, 1909
Statherotis diakonoffi Kuznetzov, 1988
Statherotis discana (Felder & Rogenhofer, 1875)
Statherotis euryphaea (Turner, 1916)
Statherotis holotricha Diakonoff, 1973
Statherotis iricolor (Meyrick, 1930)
Statherotis leucaspis (Meyrick, in Gardiner, 1902)
Statherotis licnuphora Diakonoff, 1973
Statherotis micrandra Diakonoff, 1973
Statherotis olenarcha (Meyrick, 1931)
Statherotis pendulata (Meyrick, 1911)
Statherotis perculta Diakonoff, 1973
Statherotis polychlora Diakonoff, 1973
Statherotis porphyrochlora Diakonoff, 1973
Statherotis semaeophora Diakonoff, 1973
Statherotis solomonensis (Bradley, 1957)
Statherotis tapinopa Diakonoff, 1973
Statherotis tetrarcha (Meyrick, 1920)
Statherotis towadaensis Kawabe, 1978
Statherotis toxosema (Turner, 1946)
Statherotis transsecta Diakonoff, 1973

See also
List of Tortricidae genera

References

External links
tortricidae.com

Olethreutini
Tortricidae genera
Taxa named by Edward Meyrick